Joan Dix (later Jones, 3 August 1918 – 1991) was an English figure skater who competed in ladies singles. In 1932 she finished tenth at the Winter Olympics and world championships, and seventh at the European championships. Her father Fred Dix was an Olympic speed skater.

References

1918 births
1991 deaths
Olympic figure skaters of Great Britain
Figure skaters at the 1932 Winter Olympics
People from Raunds
British female single skaters